Beyond the Gates is the first studio album by HammerFall vocalist Joacim Cans and was released in 2004. Samwise Didier, who has done most of the artwork for Hammerfall, made the cover art. Charlie Bauerfeind, who produced many of band's albums, was the producer. Cans bandmates Oscar Dronjak and Stefan Elmgren are also featured on the record. Most of the album was recorded at Studio Fredman in Cans's hometown: Gothenburg, Sweden.

Track listing

Personnel 
Band members
Joacim Cans - vocals, producer
"Metal" Mike Chlasciak - lead & rhythm guitars
Stefan Elmgren - lead & rhythm guitars, keyboards, producer, engineer
Daniele Soravia - keyboards
Mat Sinner - bass, backing vocals
Mark Zonder - drums, engineer

Additional musicians
Gus G - lead guitar on "Beyond the Gates"
Danny Gill - lead guitar on "Dreams"
Oscar Dronjak, Mats Rendlert, Joacim "Lill" Lundberg, Jonatan Nordström, Hilda Lerme, Jenny Gustafsson - backing vocals

Production
Charlie Bauerfeind - producer, engineer, mixing, mastering
Achim Kohler - engineer

References

2004 debut albums
Noise Records albums
Albums produced by Charlie Bauerfeind